Power Play is a Canadian television drama series, which aired on CTV from 1998 to 2000. The series was filmed at Copps Coliseum (now FirstOntario Centre) in Hamilton, Ontario.

The show starred Michael Riley as Brett Parker, a former New York City sports agent who became the general manager of a (fictional) National Hockey League franchise, the Hamilton Steelheads.

One of the throughline plots of the series dealt with Parker's ongoing love–hate relationships with the sport, the team and his superior at McArdle Industries, corporate executive Colleen Blessed, played by Kari Matchett.

The cast also included Gordon Pinsent as team owner Duff McArdle, Jonathan Crombie, Jennifer Dale and Al Waxman. The show's theme song was a modernized version of the Stompin' Tom Connors classic, "The Hockey Song", performed partly by Connors himself, and then transitioning to the performance of the band Rusty.

The show was briefly aired on the United States broadcast network UPN, starting in 1999, but was pulled after two episodes. The second episode aired in the United States has the distinction of being the lowest-rated episode (since the Nielsen ratings service began in the 1950s) of any prime-time TV series ever aired by any United States network.

Cast

Main 
 Michael Riley – Brett Parker
 Kari Matchett – Colleen Blessed
 Dean McDermott – Mark Simpson
 Caterina Scorsone – Michelle Parker
 Gordon Pinsent – Duff McArdle

Recurring 
 Jonathan Rannells – Todd Maplethorpe
 Mark Lutz – Jukka Branny-Acke
 Krista Bridges – Rose Thorton
 Normand Bissonnette – Al Tremblay
 Lori Anne Alter – Renata D'Allesandro
 Greg Spottiswood – Joe Harriman
 Al Waxman – Lloyd Gorman
 Johanna Black – Andrea Stuyvesant
 Neil Crone – Harry Strand
 Jonathan Crombie – Hudson James
 Fiona Highet – Rayanne Simpson
 David Keeley – Bud Travis
 Jennifer Dale – Samantha Robbins
 Don Cherry – Jake Nelson
 Tanja Jacobs – SM3 Reagan Sexsmith
 Chris Tessaro – Marshak
 Rob Faulds – Play-by-Play Announcer
 Sean McCann – Ray Malone

All-time Hamilton Steelheads roster 
The following players have been seen playing for the Steelheads over the course of the series:
 1 Tremblay
 1 McCloud
 2 Banks
 3 Kudlow
 4 Borden
 7 Schmöckel
 9 Simpson
 10 Wynn
 12 Sauvé
 13 Bränny-Acke
 14 Marshak
 16 Lalonde
 18 Grant
 22 Maplethorpe
 23 Dee
 24 Stephanovic
 25 St. Germaine
 26 Pacelli
 28 Chartraw
 29 Alexander: D. Parent
 30 MacDougall
 32 Shipton
 37 Ignarson
 40 Zinoviev
 44 Bedard
 48 McNally
 55 Gunn
 75 Kerensky
 75 Robinson

Episodes

Season one 
 "Perambulate Me Back to My Habitual Abode" (Sept 21 1998)
 "Changing the Luck" (Sept 28 1998)
 "All for One"
 "Seventh Game"
 "Off Season"
 "Brothers in Arms"
 "The Bad Boy"
 "Purple Hazing"
 "Family Values"
 "Pucks the Size of Beach Balls"
 "High Noon"
 "Dire Straits"
 "Waked at the Forum"

Season two 
 "Everything is Broken"
 "Resign or Re-Sign"
 "Manipulation"
 "Evasion"
 "Temptation"
 "The Truth"
 "The Jumper"
 "The Mask"
 "Foolish Hearts"
 "The Quarter Finals"
 "The Cubicle"
 "The Finals"
 "What It All Meant"

References

External links 

 

CTV Television Network original programming
UPN original programming
History of Hamilton, Ontario
Sport in Hamilton, Ontario
Ice hockey television series
1998 Canadian television series debuts
2000 Canadian television series endings
Television shows set in Hamilton, Ontario
1990s Canadian drama television series
2000s Canadian drama television series
Television series by Alliance Atlantis
Television series by Bell Media
Television shows filmed in Hamilton, Ontario
20th century in Hamilton, Ontario